Jianfengia is an extinct genus of Middle Cambrian (Atdabanian) megacheiran arthropod found in the Maotianshan Shale Lagerstätte of China. It contains the single species Jianfengia multisegmentalis. The head has a pair of stalked eyes, a hypostome/labrum complex, a pair of great appendages with five podomeres, and four pairs of biramous limbs. The maximum known number of trunk segments is 27, though most known specimens have 20, which are associated with pairs of biramous appendages, and the body ends with a telson spine. It has been placed as a member of the family Jiangfengiidae, alongside Fortiforceps and Sklerolibyon as well as possibly Parapeytoia.

See also 
 List of Chengjiang Biota species by phylum
 Megadictyon

References

Megacheira
Cambrian arthropods
Cambrian animals of Asia
Cambrian Series 2 first appearances
Maotianshan shales fossils
Fossil taxa described in 1987
Prehistoric arthropod genera

Cambrian genus extinctions